The Hawadle or Xawaadle  are a Somali clan who traces its descent from Mayle Samaale, one of the sons of Samaale clan. The Hawadle, as well as many other Somali clans like the Dir, trace themselves from Samaale.

Distribution 
The Hawadle primarily live in the Hiran and Banadir. They are also present in Qoryooley district of Lower Shabelle and in Gedo and the Middle Juba. They also inhabit the Somali region of Ethiopia and the North East Province of Kenya. They can also be found in the expatriate communities of the Somali diaspora.

Lineage 

Ali Jimale Ahmed outlines the Hawadle clan genealogical tree in The Invention of Somalia:
Samaale
Meyle
Maxamed 
 Xawaadle
 Midigsame
 Miinlaawe

Notable people  
Omar Hashi Aden - was a member of the Transitional Federal Government of Somalia, eventually rising to Security Minister, and the mayor of Mogadishu in 1992.
Ali Abdullahi Osoble -former Minister of National Security of Somalia, first President of Hirshabelle state
Mohamed Abdi Waare -2nd President of Hirshabelle state
Abdullahi Godah Barre -Somali politician and member of parliament, Minister of Education and Higher Education of Somalia, former Minister of Interior and Federal affairs

References

Somali clans